Svietlahorsk or Svetlogorsk, known as Shatsilki until 1961, is a town in Gomel Region, Belarus. It serves as the administrative center of Svietlahorsk District. It is situated on the Berezina River and has 67,054 inhabitants (2019 estimate).

Svietlаhorsk-na-Biarezinie (Svietlаhorsk on Biarezina) is also a railroad station on the Zhlobin — Kalinkavichy railway line.

Town structure
Svietlahorsk is divided into two major parts: agricultural-industrial area on the east of Svietlahorsk and the residential area on the west of Svietlahorsk. There are no occupied residential buildings in its industrial area (apart from lechebno-trudovoy profilaktoriy, which is a type of prison of the Soviet legacy, dedicated to forced rehab of alcoholics and drug-addicts).

Industrial area
The industrial area's main street is the Zavadskaja vulica. Along Zavadskaja street, five major factories are located:
  ("Svietlahorsk Chemical Fibre Plant"), an artificial fibre plant, one of the main chemical plants in Belarusian chemical sector.
 The cellulose and cardboard factory, which mainly produces cardboard and cardboard packaging.
 The cellusose whitening plant, a recently built plant which produces sulfur-whitened crude cellulose from raw wood.
  ("Svietlahorsk house-building plant") which is dedicated to production of mixed metal-concrete blocs used for large-scale apartment block buildings.

There are also industrial railway lines of 's cellulose and cardboard factories, crossing Sverdlova street under the bridge. At the end of the industrial area, Sverdlova street's part is the:
  ("Svietlahorsk Mixed Metal-Concrete Plant") which mass-produces smaller metal-concrete blocks used in construction. But unlike Svietlahorsk house-building plant,  does not produce complete sections of multifloor apartment blocks, mainly the smaller blocks like metal-concrete curbstones and metal-concrete blocks used to enclose technical wells.

  ("Svietlahorsk vegetable greenhouses") which produces a range of vegetables for the local population: potatoes, beets, carrots, onions, etc.
  ("Svietlahorsk fish farm") which mainly produces locally bred fish for local consumption
  ("Svietlahorsk Power Plant"), the 150MWt mixed-fuel (mainly gas) power plant, supplying Svietlahorsk, and also partly Rechitsa and Zhlobin.

Residential area
The residential area encompasses the town of Svietlohorsk's main part and it is the area were all people in Svietlahorsk live. It is mainly divided into the communal area and the private area, which a few exceptions there and in between.

Communal living area
Communal living area of Svietlahorsk is the area where all utilities (electricity, water, canalization, TV, broadband and, most-importantly, external house renovation) are all largely provided by the state-owned  ("Svietac communal-living unitary enterprise"). It's a densely-populated main residential area of Svietlahorsk, which is home to around 55,000 of its people.

Unlike the name may suggest, there are almost no true communal residential houses in the area, and this is where most multifloor apartments blocks of Svietlahorsk are located. Most apartments are privately owned by families living in them, although in the same buildings there are a number of state-owned apartments which the state leases to people living in them.

From 1964 to the current time, coinciding with the start of Chemical fibre plant construction the approach to housing in Svietlahorsk changed.

Addressing schemes
From 1964 on, all buildings within  were getting -based addresses, e.g.  1, house 14, flat 30, if it was for flats, or  1, house 12A, if it was a kindergarten or other building not dedicated to housing.

To add to this experimental scheme, at first,  were only listed by natural numbers, which led to the short addressing scheme which looked like 1-10-11, which stood for " 1, house 10, flat 11". This short addressing scheme is still widely used in Svietlahorsk hospital patients' medical records.

Later, the  numbers were augmented with human-sounding names, for instance,  1 became  "Oktyabrski". However, the previous short scheme persists to this day, and still it is widespread to call  by numbers.

There were de facto  which had no -level subdivision (for instance the "Pyatisotki" district) of addresses, but street-level subdivision. From 2018 onwards, "Svetoch" started to implement the all-Belarusian law demanding the street-level addressing for all buildings in Belarus.

, according to implementation of the aforementioned law by "Svetoch" have not perished, but were left only as to signify the discrete sets of apartment blocks delimited from one another.

The normalization of addresses led to the fact that all following addresses are currently referring to the single flat in Svietlahorsk (and all of them are correct and being used as of 2021):

whereas, "Zavulak Startavy, 1" is the new address for the same house that was previously called ", house 48".

Despite the new street-level addressing, the post offices continue to serve -level addressed parcels, and so do the rest of administrative and commercial structures in Svietlahorsk.

Current microdistricts
The list of microdistricts (mikrorayons) of Svietlahorsk, as of 2021:
Mikrarajon Stary Horad (Mikrorayon Staryy Gorod, previously unnumbered)
Mikrarajon Kastrycnicki (Mikrorayon Oktyabrski, mikrorayon 1)
Mikrarajon Piersamajski (Mikrorayon Pervomayskiy, mikrorayon 2)
Mikrarajon Maladziozny (Mikrorayon Molodezhnyy, mikrorayon 3)
Mikrarajon Jubiliejny (Mikrorayon Yubileynyy, mikrorayon 4)
Mikrarajon Piatisotki (Mikrorayon Pyatisotki, previously unnumbered)
Mikrarajon Sacilki (Mikrorayon Shatilki, mikrorayon 5)
Mikrarajon Biarezina (Mikrorayon Berezina, mikrorayon 6)
Mikrarajon Paliessie (Mikrorayon Polesye, mikrorayon 6A)
Mikrarajon Paudniovy (Mikrorayon Yuzhnyy, mikrorayon 8)

Mikrarajon Kastrycnicki
Mikrarajon Kastrycnicki was the first numbered  of Svietlahorsk, largely built between 1964 and 1969, with an additional houses built on its edge during the 1989 to 1991 and some additional houses being built there to this day, albeit sporadically (the last one was built in 2012). It mostly consists of five-floor  spanning several podyezds (but not less than 2 podyezds per apartment block) with, typically 60-120 apartments per block.

Houses built in 1989 - 1991 are nine-storey apartment buildings with one to five podyezds each.

 Kastrycnicki has one school, one stadium with taekwondo school, sprint running school and a gym, four kindergartens, one kindergarten for children with special needs, one boxing sportschool and an internal park.

Mikrarajon Piersamajski
Mikrarajon Piersamajski was the second numbered  built in Svietlahorsk, largely in 1967–1972.

Mikrarajon Piersamajski has two schools, four kindergartens.

Unlike Kastrycnicki, which was built from a cleaned-up construction site and later planted with mainly deciduous trees, Piersamajski was built preserving the pine forest where it was sited, so all internal yards of Piersamajski contain actual pine forest.

Mikrarajon Maladziozny
Mikrarajon Maladziozny is by far the largest  in Svietlahorsk. It has more than 90 apartment blocks and most of those apartment blocks are 9-floor houses spanning several podyezds. It was the Maladziozny, which foreseen the architectural policy change in 1976 which forbade the construction of 5-floor blocks in favour of 9-floor blocks. Maladziozny was mostly built in the 1970s and the 1980s, with the most recent houses built there in the early 2010s.

Maladziozny is the first numbered  in Svietlahorsk not completely contained within enclosing streets: Maladziozny is itself crossed by vulica Azalava and vulica Lunacarskaha.

Maladziozny has four schools, multiple kindergartens, a pediatric clinic, and a center for after-school education of children.

Mikrarajon Piatisotki
Mikrarajon Piatisotki is a small  mostly built in the late 1960s to the early 1970s behind the market on Internacyajanalnaja street, which first passed through the Stary Horad, then went through the central town market. Two houses, five-floor and nine-storey with full-fledged non- apartments where additionally built there later, in the late 1980s.

Piatisotki has one school, no kindergartens, Svietlahorsk court and Svietlahorsk military command office.

Mikrorajón Jubiliejny
Internacyajanalnaja street, before the Jubiliejny was built, spanned the Stary Horad, then it went through the town market and then to Piatisotki. In the late 1980s, architectural policy demanded to demolish the town market and to establish a new town square and town center, enclosed by two new .

Jubiliejny was one of these two  and it was built on the site of the demolished town market. It completely consists of 9-floor apartment buildings with the only exception of the so-called  ("the 16-floor one"), which has 16 floors and is a peak of architectural ensemble, foreseeing the new town square.

Mikrorajón Šacilki
Construction of the new town square demanded also that the village Šacilki, where Svietlahorsk started, had to be mostly demolished near the new town square. But the construction, which started in the early 1990s, stopped halfway, due to Soviet Union collapse and the changed attitudes towards property and private housing, which became preferable to apartment-block living in the new post-communist era. Therefore,  (microdistrict) Šacilki was never properly built. It now consists of one five-storey two-entance house, one nine-floor residential house and two conjoined 10-storey multi-entrance residential houses overlooking the town square, including the so-called  (house with a clock).

In the early 2010s, the renewed interest to construction in this  was brought in by the Iranian investment to the construction of two-large malls in  Šacilki, which are popularly called  (Persian quarter). Malls were built, went into service, but the further plans to build  several more multifloor apartment blocks behind 
 by 2015 were never realized.

Industry
Within Svietlahorsk there are many industrial activities and organizations, including the power plant, a chemical man-made fiber plant, a reinforced concrete industrial complex, a petroleum producing industry, a pulp and paper milk industry, butter-making factory, a bakery, and an industrial college.

Religion
Eastern Orthodoxy is by far the dominant religion in Svietlahorsk, followed by Catholicism. There are several Protestant churches. There are three Eastern Orthodox churches, one Catholic cathedral built in 1997, a Baptist prayer house on Paryckaja street, an Evangelical church behind the sixth microdistrict and a New Apostolic church near the town's  (public baths).

Apart from mainstream Christian congregations, there is a prominent Jehovah's Witnesses community in Svietlahorask. Earlier, in the 1990s and the early 2000s there has also been an active local Protestant community called "The Light Of Truth" (in ), which ceased most of its operations by the late 2000s.

Sights
 Eastern Orthodox cathedral with a gold-plated domes near the fourth microdistrict.
 Catholic cathedral near the city near the Svietlahorsk waterfront
 The quay
 Museum of local lore on Lenina street
 Art gallery "Tradition" near the corner of the second microdistrict, which hosts exhibitions and a variety of paintings, drawings and art objects by the painters from Svietlahorsk and beyond
 Monument to Raman Sacila, the purported founder of Sacilki
 Monument to Petr Miroshnichenko, Hero of the Soviet Union who shielded the battalion of Soviet soldiers from a German machinegun with his chest in battles near Svietlahorsk, depicting Petr in his battle munition, kneeling
 monument to the Unknown Soldier near the town's railway station, where particularly harsh battles between German and Soviet army units took place, depicting an unknown soldier in his battle munition, kneeling 
  Monument on the town's waterfront dedicated to all and everyone who fell a victim to the Second World War; it is bell-shaped
 Monument to soldiers from Svietlahorsk who died in Soviet-Afghan war, depicting two Soviet male soldiers near a crashed helicopter, on the town's waterfront
 Tank remade into a monument on the town's waterfront.
 A wedding vow arc on the town's waterfront where newly-wed couples leave locked doorlocks on it as a symbol to their marital commitment.
  (knight) sculpture carved from  tree stump near the Pyatisotki microdistrict.
 Wooden sculpture of mother and child near the "Tradition" art gallery.
 Wooden monument to youth near the corner of the third microdistrict
 Statue of Prometheus holding fire near the House of Culture of the Energy Workers.
 Additional monuments to Prometheus near all major highway entrances to Svietlahorsk
 Great Gatsby mural on the private house near the town's waterfront.

Health
Svietlahorsk, like much of Gomel Region, suffered extensive radioactive fallout after the Chernobyl Accident of 1986. This has led to significant health and ecological issues in the city and surrounding countryside.

International relations

Svietlahorsk is twinned with:

 Călărași District, Moldova
 Călărași, Romania
 Chernushinsky District, Russia
 Helmstedt, Germany
 Ivanteyevka, Russia

 Kingisepp, Russia
 Kommunar, Russia
 Mendip, England, United Kingdom
 Mtskheta, Georgia
 Obzor (Nesebar), Bulgaria
 Pushkinsky District, Russia
 Sliven, Bulgaria
 Svetlogorsk, Russia
 Svetly, Russia

References

External links

 Светлагорск (Шацілкі). Суполка землякоў | Svietlahorsk (Šacilki). Local group | Светлогорск (Шатилки). Группа земляков // Facebook

Populated places in Gomel Region
Svietlahorsk District
Minsk Voivodeship
Bobruysky Uyezd
Towns in Belarus

eo:Svetlogorsk
it:Svetlogorsk
lt:Svetlogorskas
fi:Svetlogorsk